The Coronado Historic District is a U.S. historic district (designated as such on February 21, 1997) located in New Smyrna Beach, Florida. The district is bounded by Columbus, Due East, and Pine Avenues, and the Indian River. It contains 83 historic buildings.

Gallery

References

External links
 Volusia County listings at National Register of Historic Places

National Register of Historic Places in Volusia County, Florida
Historic districts on the National Register of Historic Places in Florida
New Smyrna Beach, Florida